Balgazy (Balğajı) is a rural locality (a village) in Nikifarovsky Selsoviet, Alsheyevsky District, Bashkortostan, Russia. The population was 95 as of 2010. There are 2 streets.

Geography 
Balgazy is located 57 km southwest of Rayevsky (the district's administrative centre) by road. Novye Balgazy is the nearest rural locality.

References 

Rural localities in Alsheyevsky District